Habibie is a surname. Notable people with the surname include:
 B. J. Habibie (1936–2019), president of Indonesia 1998–1999
 Hasri Ainun Habibie (1937–2010), Indonesian physician and wife of President B. J. Habibie
 Junus Effendi Habibie (1937–2012), Indonesian diplomat and brother of President B. J. Habibie
 Rusli Habibie (born 1963), Indonesian politician, nephew of President B. J. Habibie, and current governor of Gorontalo

See also
 
 Habibi (disambiguation)
Habibie & Ainun, a 2012 Indonesian drama film
Rudy Habibie, a 2016 prequel

Indonesian-language surnames